2-Imidazolidinethione is the organosulfur compound with the formula C2H2(NH)2C=S.  It is a cyclic unsaturated thiourea with a short C=S bond length of 169 pm.  The compound is often referred to as 2-mercaptoimidazole, which is a tautomer that is not observed. The compound forms a variety of metal complexes. In terms of bonding and reactivity, 2-imidazolidinethione is similar to mercaptobenzimidazole.

References

Thioureas
Nitrogen heterocycles